The Nokia 8110 4G is a Nokia-branded mobile phone developed by HMD Global. It was announced on 25 February 2018 at Mobile World Congress (MWC) 2018 in Barcelona, Spain, as a revival of the original Nokia 8110, which was popularly known as the "Matrix phone" or "banana phone". The phone is dual SIM capable even though it is limited to 2G in one slot while running both SIM. It runs on an operating system based on KaiOS.

Firmware history 
Firmware version 11 added Google services like Google Search, YouTube, Google Maps and Google Assistant. This was arranged through the company's partnership with Google.

Since firmware version 13, a Twitter app is also installed by default.

In firmware version 15, the Facebook and WhatsApp apps were made available via Store.

Firmware releases

Connectivity
The phone works on many systems in Europe.  It has not worked on AT&T since February 2021, when the company switched to 3G only.

References

8110
Mobile phones introduced in 2018
Nokia phones by series
Slider phones